The Uppland Runic Inscription 954  is a Viking Age runestone engraved in Old Norse with the Younger Futhark runic alphabet. It was found by Johannes Bureus, but it has disappeared. It was located near Danmark Church in Uppsala Municipality. The style is possibly Pr1.

Inscription
Transliteration of the runes into Latin characters

 [× þʀu : aʀrukr : fretr : ri--u : s... ...-r : helka : bruþr : sin : en : sasur : trab : han : ouk : kaþ · niþiks:uerk : seik : felka : sin : kuþ : helb : hut : has ×]

Old Norse transcription:

 

English translation:

 "Eyríkr(?)/Auðríkr(?) and his kinsmen, they raised the stone in memory of Helgi, their brother. And Sassurr killed him and made (= did) a villainous deed, betrayed his partner. God help his spirit."

References

Runestones in Uppland